The review Estudis Romànics (ER) was founded in 1947 by Ramón Aramón Serra. It is based in Barcelona.

Since 2000 and until 2014 it was directed by Antonio María Badía Margarit, emeritus member of the Philological Section of the IEC, who has the collaboration of the Editing Committee, and the advice of the Scientific Council. Since 2004 Juan Veñ was co-director and is its current director.

The Estudis Romànics is issued every year, and they are devoted to linguistics, philology, literary criticism and Romance-speaking Europe literatures, without limits of matters, method or chronology. This magazine gathers global and particular contributions from each language.

The ER volumes have three parts:
 Articles.
 Recensions.
 Reports.

The ER collaborations are written mainly in any romance language (or also in German or in English). The official editing language is Catalan.

References

External links
 Publications website of the IEC

1947 establishments in Spain
Annual magazines
Catalan-language magazines
Literary magazines published in Spain
Magazines established in 1947
Magazines published in Barcelona